The  is a railway line in northeastern Shikoku, Japan that connects the prefectural capitals Takamatsu (Kagawa) and Tokushima (Tokushima).

Sanuki, the name of the ancient province that preceded the modern Kagawa Prefecture, appears in the names of four stations on the line.

Services
The Uzushio limited express serves the entire line.

In addition to local trains that run the entire length of the Kōtoku Line, there are trains that run between Takamatsu and Orange Town, Sambommatsu, and Hiketa, as well as between Tokushima and Itano and Tokushima and Hiketa. For a single-tracked line service levels are quite high, except along the prefectural border between Itano and Hiketa. In Tokushima there are through trains to/from the Naruto and Mugi lines, with one train per day running from Takamatsu to  via .

Since the completion of electrification work between Takamatsu and Iyoshi on the Yosan Line, the Kōtoku Line has received some of the newest DMUs on the JR Shikoku network. Local services often use 1000 series, 1200 series and 1500 series DMUs, while limited express services are handled by N2000 series DMUs.

Station list 
 Local trains stop at all stations. For details of the Uzushio limited express service see that article.
 Trains can pass one another at stations marked "◇" and "^" and cannot pass at those marked "｜".

History
The first part of what is now the Kotoku Line was built by the Tokushima Railway, being the Sako to Tokushima section of its line from Kamojima (now the Tokushima Line) opened on February 16, 1899. That company was nationalised in 1907. In 1916 the Awa Electric Railway opened a line from Nakahara to Naruto, including the Yoshinari to Ikenotani section, which is now part of the Kotoku Line. The Takamatsu to Hikida section was opened between 1925-28 by the (then) Japanese Imperial Railways.

In 1933 the Awa Electric Railway was nationalised, and in 1935 the Hikida to Ikenotani and Yoshinari to Sako sections were opened, completing the line.

In 1977 CTC signalling became operational for the line, and freight operations ceased in 1986.

With the privatization of JNR, the line became part of the Shikoku Railway Company (JR Shikoku) on April 1, 1987. On June 1, 1988 the line name changed from Kōtoku Main Line to Kōtoku Line.

The elevated Sako Station was commissioned in 1993, and in 1998 track improvement allowing faster speeds was completed, and Orange Town Station opened.

Former connecting lines
 Itano Station: The Awa Electric Railway opened a 7 km line to Kajiyabara in 1923, it being taken over by the Japanese Imperial Railways when the company was nationalised in 1933. The line closed in 1972.

See also
List of railway lines in Japan

References
This article incorporates material from the corresponding article in the Japanese Wikipedia.

External links

 JR Shikoku official website 

Lines of Shikoku Railway Company
Rail transport in Kagawa Prefecture
Rail transport in Tokushima Prefecture
Railway lines opened in 1899
1067 mm gauge railways in Japan
1899 establishments in Japan